Rustam Akramov (11 August 1948 – 15 February 2022) was an Uzbek football coach. He coached the Uzbekistan national team from 1992 to 1994 and then the India national team from 1995 to 1997.

In February 2015, while serving as technical director for Uzbekistan football, he was rebuked by the Uzbekistan Football Federation for "unsportsmanlike conduct" of his players.

Akramov died on 15 February 2022, at the age of 73.

Honours

Manager

India
SAFF Championship runner-up: 1995
South Asian Games Gold medal: 1995

References

1948 births
2022 deaths
People from Tashkent Region
Uzbekistani football managers
Uzbekistan national football team managers
India national football team managers
Uzbekistani expatriate football managers
Expatriate football managers in India
Uzbekistani expatriate sportspeople in India